Anthony Salvatore Maggiacomo (born April 25, 1984) is a former Canadian football linebacker. He was signed by the Winnipeg Blue Bombers as an undrafted free agent in 2008. He played CIS Football for the Wilfrid Laurier Golden Hawks.

Teaching career
Anthony Salvatore Maggiacomo was previously a student-teacher at Cameron Heights Collegiate Institute and a phys-ed teacher at Eastwood. He is now a Phys-Ed teacher and Sr. Football Coach at Jacob Hespeler Secondary School.

External links
Just Sports Stats

Winnipeg Blue Bombers bio
Cameron Heights Collegiate Institute

1984 births
Living people
People from Cambridge, Ontario
Players of Canadian football from Ontario
Canadian football linebackers
Montreal Alouettes players
Wilfrid Laurier Golden Hawks football players
Winnipeg Blue Bombers players